The Bigger Artist is the debut studio album by American rapper A Boogie wit da Hoodie. It was released on September 29, 2017, by Highbridge and Atlantic Records, serving as the second commercial release with Atlantic. The album features guest appearances from Chris Brown, Trey Songz, Kodak Black, 21 Savage, PnB Rock, YoungBoy Never Broke Again, Robin Thicke and Don Q. Meanwhile, production comes from Metro Boomin, DJ Mustard, Murda Beatz, and Cardo, among others.

Background
The album was announced on July 17, 2017. The album's cover art was revealed on September 3, 2017. The tracklist and pre-order was released on September 8, 2017.

Singles
The lead single, "Drowning" featuring Kodak Black, was released on March 10, 2017. "Beast Mode" featuring PnB Rock and YoungBoy Never Broke Again, was released as a pre-order single on September 8, 2017. The second and final single, "Say A'", was released on September 22, 2017.

Commercial performance
The Bigger Artist debuted at number four on the US Billboard 200 with 67,000 album-equivalent units, of which 10,000 were in pure album sales in its first week of release. It is A Boogie wit da Hoodie's third work to appear on the chart, and his highest-peaking after Hoodie SZN. On August 21, 2019, the album was certified platinum by the Recording Industry Association of America (RIAA) for combined sales and album-equivalent units of over a million units in the United States.

Track listing

Notes
  signifies a co-producer

Sample credits
 "Bad Girl" contains an interpolation from "Teach U a Lesson", performed by Robin Thicke.
 "Get to You" contains an interpolation from "Ex-Factor", performed by Lauryn Hill.
 "Stalking You" contains an interpolation from "This Love", performed by Maroon 5.

Charts

Weekly charts

Year-end charts

Certifications

References

2017 debut albums
Atlantic Records albums
Albums produced by Cardo
Albums produced by Murda Beatz
Albums produced by Illmind
Albums produced by Metro Boomin
Albums produced by Nav (rapper)
Albums produced by Scott Storch
Albums produced by DJ Mustard
A Boogie wit da Hoodie albums